The HQ-6, also known as LY-60, is a family of Chinese air defense missiles developed by the Shanghai Academy of Science and Technology, largely based on the Chinese PL-11 and Italian Selenia  (now as Leonardo S.p.A.) Aspide missile.

Development
HQ-6 is a surface-to-air missile system developed by the Shanghai Academy of Science and Technology, incorporating technologies from PL-11 missile. PL-11 is the license-produced version of Aspide missile, which itself is based on the American AIM-7 Sparrow missile. It was speculated the missile is a copy of AIM-7 when the system was revealed in the late 1970s, though HQ-6 is considerably larger than the AIM-7 Sparrow. HQ-6 missile went through multiple iterations, and an export variant named LY-60 was also developed.

Variants

PL-11

The PL-11 is a medium-range semi-active radar homing (SARH) air-to-air missile (AAM) developed by a subsidiary of the Shanghai Academy of Spaceflight Technology in the People's Republic of China. It is a derivate or copy of the Italian Aspide air-to-air missile, which in turn was developed from the American AIM-7 Sparrow. PL-11 is not officially a part of the HQ-6 surface-to-air missile family, but it serves as the technology base for the HQ-6.

HQ-61

The HQ-61 is the first member of the HQ-6 missile family. The entire SAM system consists of four truck-mounted radars (one search/surveillance radar and three tracking/fire control radars), one power supply truck, and six transporter erector launchers (TEL). The missile itself is directly derived from the air-to-air version PL-11. But unlike the Italian Aspide which uses containers as launchers, HQ-6 uses missile launching rails (MLR) instead, and each truck-mounted launcher has two missile rails. Specifications:
Length: 3.99 m
Diameter: 286  mm
Wingspan: 1 m
Weight: 300 kg
Speed: Mach 3
Maximum maneuvering overload: 35G
Maximum maneuvering overload [interception]: 7G
Range: 30m to 8 km (altitude), 10 m to 10 km (slant)
Guidance: Semi-Active Radar Homing

The HQ-61 was deployed on Type 053H2G frigate Jiangwei I frigate of the People's Liberation Army Navy Surface Force. The HQ-61 was equipped on four Type 053H2G built between 1988 and 1991. The capability of the missile was questioned by the Chinese Navy, and the missile system was eventually replaced by the HQ-7 air defense system.

LY-60
In October 1994, China unveils a new medium-low-altitude surface-to-air missile system named LY-60. LY-60 was designed to intercept military aircraft and missiles flying in medium to low altitudes. To improve anti-jamming capability, the command control system features a unique artificial interference system due to its improved microprocessor, never seen before in contemporary medium-low-altitude air defense missiles. The search radar of the LY-60 can track up to 40 targets simultaneously, and the tracking radar is able to simultaneously track 12 targets, and engage three targets at once.

HQ-64

The HQ-64 is an improved version of the HQ-61, incorporating experience and technologies gained from the LY-60 project. When paired with a command vehicle, the system is called HQ-6D air defense system. The firepower is doubled by increasing the number of missiles for each truck mounted launcher from two to four, and by replacing the launching rails with container box launchers, the reliability is also increased. Both the missile and transporter vehicles are directly developed from the LY-60 system. The missile is smaller than that of the HQ-6, yet the performance is enhanced due to technological improvements. HQ-64 passed the state certification test and was accepted into Chinese service in 2001. 

Each command vehicle is able to command & control up to four HQ-64 batteries, linking up independent HQ-64 batteries to form an integrated air defense net work, and individual HQ-64 network can in turn be integrated into a larger air defense zone. The field deployment time of HQ-64 SAM system is 9 to 15 minutes. Specifications:
Length: 3.89 m
Diameter: 203  mm
Weight: 220 kg
Speed: Mach 3
Range: 30m to 12 km (altitude), 10 m to 18 km (slant)
Guidance: Semi-Active Radar Homing

HQ-6A
HQ-6A is a gun-missile air defense system combining a HQ-64 missile launcher with a LD-2000 close-in weapon system.

Current operators

References

 19960619, National Air Intelligence Center (NAIC):  "Lieh Ying: The Chinese-built Surface to Air Missile Weapon System", An Hua, NAIC-ID(RS)T-0253-96

Bibliography

See also
List of missiles
PL-11

PL-11
Surface-to-air missiles of the People's Republic of China
Guided missiles of the People's Republic of China
Weapons of the People's Republic of China
Military equipment introduced in the 1980s